Adamsville is a rural, unincorporated community located in southeastern Hillsborough County, Florida. The community is served by a 33534 ZIP Code. Although a separate community, it is a part of the census-designated place (CDP) of Gibsonton.

Geography 
Adamsville is located at 27.8147489 North, 82.383982 West, or about 2.7 miles south of Gibsonton.  The elevation of the community is three feet above sea level.

Education
The community of Adamsville is served by Hillsborough County Schools, which serves the entire county.

References

External links
Adamsville page from Hometown Locator

Unincorporated communities in Hillsborough County, Florida
Unincorporated communities in Florida
Populated places on Tampa Bay